Louis Marie de La Révellière-Lépeaux (24 August 1753 – 24 March 1824) was a deputy to the National Convention during the French Revolution.  He later served as a prominent leader of the French Directory.

Life
He was born at Montaigu (Vendée), the son of J. B. de la Révellière. He adopted the name Lépeaux from a small property belonging to his family, and he was known locally as M. de Lépeaux. He studied law at Angers and Paris, being called to the bar in 1775. A deputy to the Estates-General of 1789, he returned at the close of the session to Angers, where with his school-friends J. B. Leclerc and Urbain-René Pilastre he sat on the council of Maine-et-Loire, and had to deal with the first Vendéen outbreaks. In 1792 he was returned by the département to the Convention, and on 19 November he proposed the famous decree by which France offered protection to foreign nations in their struggle for liberty.

Although La Révellière-Lépeaux voted for the death of Louis XVI, he was not in general agreement with the extremists. He was proscribed with the Girondins in 1793, and remained in hiding until the revolt of 9 Thermidor (27 July 1794). After serving on the commission to prepare the initiation of the new constitution he became in July 1795 president of the Assembly, and shortly afterwards a member of the Committee of Public Safety. His name stood first on the list of directors elected, and he became president of the Directory.

Of his colleagues he was in alliance with Jean-François Rewbell and to a lesser degree with Barras, but the greatest of his fellow-directors, Lazare Carnot, was the object of his undying hatred. His policy was marked by a bitter hostility to the Christian religion, which he proposed to supplant as a civilizing agent by theophilanthropy, a new religion invented by the English deist David Williams. The credit of the coup d'état of 18 Fructidor (4 September 1797), by which the allied directors made themselves supreme, La Révellière-Lépeaux arrogated to himself in his Mémoires, which in this as in other matters must be read with caution.

Compelled to resign by the Coup of 30 Prairial Year VII (18 June 1799), he lived in retirement in the country, and took no further part in public affairs even after his return to Paris ten years later. 196403

Notes

References
 
 The Mémoires of La Révellière-Lépeaux were edited by R. D. D'Angers (Paris, 3 vols., 1895). See also E. Charavay, La Révellière-Lépeaux et ses mémoires (1895) and Albert Meynier, Un Représentant de la bourgeoisie angevine (1905).

External links 

 Louis-Marie de La Revellière-Lépeaux papers. General Collection, Beinecke Rare Book and Manuscript Library, Yale University.

1753 births
1824 deaths
18th-century French lawyers
People from Vendée
Directeurs of the First French Republic
Members of the Council of Five Hundred
People on the Committee of Public Safety
Burials at Père Lachaise Cemetery
French deists